Donald George Gillies (born 20 June 1951) is a Scottish former footballer, who played initially as a forward but latterly as a right back. He made over 230 Football League appearances and 45 Scottish League appearances in the 1970s in the years after the Second World War.

Career

A product of the Scottish Highland Football League, Gillies first professional club was Inverness Clachnacuddin FC, of the Scottish Highland Football League. Gillies joined Greenock Morton in October 1971 and was twice top scorer. Alan Dicks signed Gillies for £30,000 in March 1973 from Morton for Bristol City. Steve Ritchie moved in the opposite direction to Morton. Gillies made his debut for Bristol City. Gillies joined his former "Robins" teammate, Terry Cooper then the manager, to Bristol Rovers for £50,000 in June 1980. Gillies subsequently played for several West Country clubs in the Western & Southern Leagues with a spell in Cyprus playing for Anorthosis.

After retiring from playing football, Gillies worked as a sales representative until the death of his wife in July 1990. In 1997 Gillies was still living locally at Temple Cloud to the South of Bristol.

Honours
with Bristol City
Football League Second Division runners up: 1975–76
Anglo-Scottish Cup winners: 1977–78

References

1951 births
Living people
Sportspeople from Highland (council area)
Scottish footballers
Association football fullbacks
Scottish Football League players
Western Football League players
English Football League players
Southern Football League players
Greenock Morton F.C. players
Bristol City F.C. players
Bristol Rovers F.C. players
Paulton Rovers F.C. players
Gloucester City A.F.C. players
Bath City F.C. players
Trowbridge Town F.C. players
Anorthosis Famagusta F.C. players
Yeovil Town F.C. players
Scotland under-23 international footballers
Clachnacuddin F.C. players